Sphaerodactylus williamsi, also known commonly as Williams's least gecko or the Haitian striped geckolet, is a small species of lizard in the family Sphaerodactylidae. The species is endemic to Haiti.

Etymology
The specific name, williamsi, is in honor of American herpetologist Ernest Edward Williams.

Habitat
The preferred habitat of S. williamsi is forest.

Description
S. williamsi is a small species. It has small keeled dorsal scales.

Reproduction
S. williamsi is oviparous.

References

Further reading
Rösler H (2000). "Kommentierte Liste der rezent, subrezent und fossil bekannten Geckotaxa (Reptilia: Gekkonomorpha)". Gekkota 2: 28–153. (Sphaerodactylus williamsi, p. 114). (in German).
Schwartz A, Henderson RW (1991). Amphibians and Reptiles of the West Indies: Descriptions, Distributions, and Natural History. Gainesville, Florida: University of Florida Press. 720 pp. . (Sphaerodactylus williamsi, p. 547).
Thomas R, Schwartz A (1983). "Variation in Hispaniolan Sphaerodactylus (Sauria: Gekkonidae)". pp. 86–98. In: Rhodin AGJ, Miyata K (editors) (1983). Advances in Herpetology and Evolutionary Biology. Essays in Honor of Ernest E. Williams. Cambridge, Massachusetts: Museum of Comparative Zoology, Harvard University. xix + 725 pp. . (Sphaerodactylus williamsi, new species, pp. 96–97 + Figure 2E on p. 90).

Sphaerodactylus
Endemic fauna of Haiti
Reptiles of Haiti
Reptiles described in 1983